Gregg Hale (born January 29 in Idaho Falls) is an American musician, record producer, and recording engineer best known for playing guitar for multi-platinum British band Spiritualized, his work as an A&R Rep for Arista Records, and his recording work with the Fox Soccer Channel, The Glenn Beck Program, Disney, Disney Interactive Studios, Activision, CNBC, NBC, KONAMI, and Guitar Hero.

Musical History 
Hale played in many bands, but in 1997, while living in Liverpool England, he met Sean Cook, Mike Mooney, and Damon Reece, all members of multi-platinum band Spiritualized. He played guitar with Spiritualized in 1997 and 1998, helping fill out live sound after the release of Ladies and Gentlemen We Are Floating in Space, which NME magazine named as their Album of the Year.  He left the band in 1998, several months before Cook, Mooney and Reece left the band, but remains good friends with the current members, especially guitar player Doggen.

Post-Spiritualized 
Since his time with Spiritualized, he has moved back to America, and worked as an A&R rep for several record labels, including Arista Records.  He currently splits time between Idaho Falls, Idaho and Salt Lake City, Utah.

Since Spiritualized, he has played in a wide range of bands including the funk rock band Soloman's Fence, the Post-Rock band Our Dark Horse, the Indie rock band Last Response, the progressive metal band American Hollow, and currently in a 90s cover band and a Radiohead tribute band.

In 2005, he and David Reilly, formerly of God Lives Underwater, began collaborating on a new project, writing songs centered on the death of Reilly's fiancé.  The project was short lived, due to Reilly's death in October 2005.

He is sponsored by ZT Amplifiers, and can often be seen playing through their "Lunchbox" and "Club" Amps.  He is a multi-instrumentalist, having played guitar, bass, drums, percussion, piano, organ, cello, violin, viola, bagpipes, and vocals on various CDs.

As a Producer, he founded and owns the record label Handsome Rob Records and Lincoln Street Sound Studio in Salt Lake, and has judged many music and battle-of-the-bands competitions. He has recorded many bands, as well as played guitar and bass, among other instruments, on many albums as a session musician.  He has also done extensive recording work for Fox, and Fox Soccer Channel.

Gregg has four College degrees, including a Master Of Business Administration, and has attended WGU, Ricks College, BYU, and UVU.

Inspired by the draft of Bruce Jenner and his college acquaintance Ronnie Price, Gregg declared for the 2005 NBA draft, but was neither drafted, nor signed as a free agent.

Gregg reviews music for LDS music blog Linescratchers.

He is first cousins on his father's side with NFL lineman David Hale.

He is second cousins on his mother's side with The Osmonds, but admits though he is a fan, he has never met them.

See also
 Spiritualized

References

External links

 Spiritualized Homepage
 Official Gregg Hale/Lincoln Street Sound Studio Myspace Page
 Official Lincoln Street Sound webpage
 ZT Amplifiers Artists Page

Living people
1977 births
Latter Day Saints from Idaho
Guitarists from Idaho
People from Idaho Falls, Idaho
American male guitarists
Spiritualized members
Western Governors University alumni
American expatriates in the United Kingdom
21st-century American guitarists
21st-century American male musicians